Montalbán is a neighborhood of Caracas belonging to the parroquia of La Vega, in Libertador Bolivarian Municipality. It borders the parishes El Paraíso and Antímano.

References

Neighbourhoods of Caracas